The Cours de Civilisation Française de la Sorbonne (CCFS - the Sorbonne French language and civilisation courses) is a private French civilisation and French language institution based in Paris since 1919 and was created as a French foreign language school, or français langue étrangère (FLE).

Primarily attended by Americans, the CCFS regroups today nearly 130 nationalities with a prominent presence of Germans, Americans, Britons, Brazilians, Chinese, Swedes, Koreans, Spaniards, Japanese, Poles and Russians. About five thousand students attend the institution each year.

Sites location

Teachings

The CCFS provide French courses for students of all levels, from complete beginners to professor of French as a foreign language. These courses prepare either to pass various national and international evaluations such as TCF or DELF or to obtain the school own certificates.

French language and civilization courses

Various formula of courses are proposed according to the learner teaching intentions and needs. These formulas are made up with various courses association that includes:

 French language classes (grammar, conjugation, spelling, vocabulary, approach to literary texts, written and oral expression);
 phonetics with language laboratory (expression, pronunciation and understanding exercises);
 French civilisation taught in lectures or in small groups.

Specialised Modules

The CCFS also prepares to pass French tests and diplomas issued by the Minister of National Education that certify French skills of foreign candidates. Some of these tests allow the entrance into the French University. These specialised modules prepare to pass:

 the TCF, TCF-SO (TCF on computer) and the TCF-DAP (French knowledge test - Preliminary Admission Application);
 the DELF (Diploma in French language studies);
 the DALF (Diploma in advanced French language studies).
 the TEF (Test d'Évaluation de Français - Diplôme de la Chambre de Commerce) and the e-TEF (digital version).

Special courses
These courses are designed for students with a good level of French. Some of these specialisations can allow to pass the Paris Chamber of Commerce and Industry's diplomas.

The "Business French" Specialisation

The Business French specialisation prepares simultaneously students for both the Sorbonne's French language certificate and the Paris Chamber of Commerce and Industry's diploma by teaching French business language (composition of business documents, study of economics articles...). It enters the wider framework of professional French lessons.

Exam Center

TCF Exam Center (CIEP-Sorbonne Centre)

Through a partnership agreement signed in 2006, the TCF CIEP-Sorbonne Centre is the only centre affiliated to the International Centre of Pedagogical Studies empowered to pass the French Knowledge Test (TCF) in Paris.

Since 2014, CCFS offers TCF examination sessions on computer (TCF-SO).

DELF-DALF Centre

In September 2010, the International Centre for Educational Studies (Centre international d'études pédagogiques - CIEP) and the CCFS signed a partnership agreement that gave birth to the DELF-DALF Exam Center.

The DELF-DALF Exam Center is a center affiliated with CIEP empowered to pass the Diploma of French Language Studies (Diplôme d'Études en Langue Française - DELF) and the Advanced Diploma of French Language (Diplôme Approfondi de Langue Française - DALF).

Groups welcome

In partnership with a number of organizations and universities, the CCFS coordinate linguistic journeys with personalised teachings.

Organization
CCFS courses are organized into sessions of various duration:
 Autumn Semester (September–December)
 Winter Session (January)
 Spring Semester (February–May)
 Summer courses (June–August with flexible durations)

See also
Francophonie
Français langue étrangère
Sorbonne
Société des Amis des Universités de Paris

References

External links

 Cours de Civilisation Française de la Sorbonne official website 
 Sorbonne official website
 Partner Institution Paris Summer Study

University of Paris
Cultural promotion organizations
French culture
Schools of French as a second or foreign language